Southern District was an electoral district for the Legislative Council of South Australia from 1882 until 1975. Prior to the passing of the Constitution Act Further Amendment Act 1881, the Legislative Council was 18 members elected by people from across the entire Province. From 1975, the Council returned to being elected from the entire state (the province had become a state of Australia in 1901).

At its creation in 1882, the Southern District consisted of seven  electoral districts for the South Australian House of Assembly - Onkaparinga, Noarlunga, Mount Barker, Encounter Bay, Albert, Victoria and East Torrens. It covered the area of the Adelaide Hills, Fleurieu Peninsula and the south east of South Australia.

Members
When created, the district was to elect six members to the Legislative Council which had been increased to 24 members, six from each of four districts. Transitional arrangements meant that members were only to be elected from the new districts as the terms of the existing members expired. From 1891, all members of the Council were elected by districts. All Southern District seats were filled from the 1890 by-election.

The Constitution Act Amendment Act 1901 reduced the size of the parliament, and Southern District then elected four members from the area of new enlarged Assembly districts of Victoria and Albert, Alexandra and Murray which covered roughly the same area, but with variation in the Adelaide Hills.

From the 1902 double dissolution election, most districts only elected 4 members, for staggered terms twice as long as those of the lower house. Legislative Council elections are held at the same time as House of Assembly elections.

References

Former electoral districts of South Australia